Johann Wolfgang Jäger was a German professor of Protestant theology and chancellor of the University of Tübingen. He was born on 17 March 1647 in Stuttgart and died on 20 April 1720 in Tübingen.

Life and works 

At the age of 16 Johann Wolfgang Jäger readily began university studies in philology, philosophy, and Protestant theology in Tübingen. He became a tutor for the eldest Prince Carl Maximilian, and also for his brother Georg Friedrich in 1676, the son of Duke Eberhard III of Württemberg. In 1680, he received the associate professorship of geography and Latin, and in 1681 the full professorship of Greek in Tübingen. In 1684, he became an instructor of practical philosophy and overseer of the Tübinger Stift.

In 1702 he was appointed chancellor of the University of Tübingen. There he was a professor of Protestant theology and provost of the collegiate church, until 1709 when he became abbot of the Adelberg Abbey and General Superintendent of the state of Württemberg.

Jäger earned his achievements in the academic world primarily in his fight against mystical Chiliastic teachers such as Jakob Böhme, Gottfried Arnold, and Johann Wilhelm Petersen. Jäger relied on the rationalist system of natural law of Hugo Grotius. Because of this, he helped to bring new ideas to the University of Tübingen. Though he had personal respect for Philipp Spener, he believed that pietism and separatism were dangers to theological doctrine, and he ardently fought against them.

His work "Compendium Theologiae...pro scholis in Ducatu Wirtembergico" was introduced to Württemberg in 1702 and it replaced older textbooks of theologians such as Matthias Hafenreffer. This work solidified orthodox doctrine by adopting Federalism and connecting closely with Biblical theology. This helped to usher in a new spirit to the faculty of the University of Tübingen.

Publications 

	„Systema theologicum dogmatico-polemicum“ (1725, 4)
	„Compendium Theologiae … pro scholis in Ducatu Wirtembergico“
	„Hist. eccl. c. parallelismo profanae“ (1692, expanded in 1709 und 1717) „ex speciali Seren. Würtem. Ducis jussu scripta“
	„Defensio Imperatoris Josphi contra curiae Romanae bullas“ (1709)
	„De Bened. Spinozae vita et doctrina“ (Dissertation, 1710).

Sources 

	A. Fr. Bök, Geschichte der Universität Tübingen, S. 141–42. Württemberg. Nebenstunden I, 1–71 (nach einem von J. selbst 1718 geschriebenen Lebenslaufe und Verzeichniß seiner bis dahin verfassten Schriften). Jöcher. Saxi Onomast. V, 413–14.

References 

1647 births
1720 deaths
18th-century German Protestant theologians
German Protestant clergy
German male non-fiction writers
Academic staff of the University of Tübingen
18th-century German male writers